Clic! (formerly: Azteca Música; Az Mix; Az Clic) is a Spanish-language pay television channel owned by TV Azteca Internacional TV de Paga (TV Azteca), specialized in entertainment and lifestyles.

History 
It was launched in 2000 as Azteca Musica, a channel mainly dedicated to Music. In September 2014, TV Azteca announced that the channel would be relaunched as Az Mix, a change that occurred on September 14, 2015. A year later, it was announced that the channel would be relaunched as Az Clic. On May 23, 2019, Az Clic would be renamed TV Aztec Clic.

Programming

References

External links 
  

Latin American cable television networks
Television networks in Mexico
TV Azteca pay television networks